Vāsudeva I (Kushano Bactrian: Βαζοδηο Bazodeo; Middle Brahmi script:  Vā-su-de-va, Chinese: 波調 Bodiao; fl. 200 CE) was a Kushan emperor, last of the "Great Kushans."  Named inscriptions dating from year 64 to 98 of Kanishka's era suggest his reign extended from at least 191 to 232 CE. He ruled in Northern India and Central Asia, where he minted coins in the city of Balkh (Bactria). He probably had to deal with the rise of the Sasanians and the first incursions of the Kushano-Sasanians in the northwest of his territory.

The last named inscription of his predecessor, Huvishka, was in the year 60 of the Kanishka era (187 CE), and the Chinese evidence suggests he was still ruling as late as 229 CE.

Contacts with China
In the Chinese historical chronicle Sanguozhi (三國志), he is recorded to have sent tribute to the Chinese emperor Cao Rui of the Wei in 229 CE (3rd year of Taihe 太和), : 
"The king of the Da Yuezhi, Bodiao (波調) (Vāsudeva), sent his envoy to present tribute and His Majesty granted him a title of "King of the Da Yuezhi Intimate with Wei (魏)"." (Sanguozhi)

He is the last Kushan ruler to be mentioned in Chinese sources. His rule corresponds to the retreat of Chinese power from Central Asia, and it is thought that Vasudeva may have filled the power vacuum in that area. The great expansion of the Dharmaguptaka Buddhist group in Central Asia during this period has also been related to this event.

Coinage
The coinage of Vasudeva consisted in gold dinars and quarter dinars, as well as copper coins. Vasudeva almost entirely removed the pantheon of deities displayed in the coinage of Kanishka and Huvishka. Apart from a few coins with the effigies of Mao and Nana, all of Vasudeva's coins feature Oesho on the reverse, who is generally identified as Shiva. On the obverse, Vasudeva restored the royal imagery of Kanishka, with the standing, making a sacrifice over an altar, although he holds a trident rather than Kanishka's spear and he appears nimbate. Another trident is sometimes also added over the small sacrificial altar. At the end of his rule, Vasudeva introduced the nandipada symbol on his coinage.

Sassanid invasion in the northwest
Vusadeva I was the last great Kushan emperor, and the end of his rule coincides with the invasion of the Sassanians as far as northwestern India, and the establishment of the Indo-Sassanians or Kushanshahs from around 240 CE. Vasudeva I may have lost the territory of Bactria with its capital in Balkh to Ardashir I Kushanshah. Thereafter, Kushan rule would be restricted to their eastern territories, in western and central Punjab.

Statuary

The relatively peaceful reign of Vasudeva is marked by an important artistic production, in particular in the area of statuary. Several Buddhist statues are dated to the reign of Vasudeva, and are important markers for the chronology of Buddhist art.

An inscription on the base of the Buddha statue of Vasudeva I is also known from the Mathura Museum: "In the 93rd year of Maharaja Devaputra Vasudeva...", probably corresponding to circa 171 CE, or 220 CE with the more recent definition of the Kanishka era as starting in 127 CE. A partially preserved Sakyamuni statue, also from Mathura, has the date "Year 94", although without mentioning Vasudeva specifically.

Dedications in the name of Vasudeva, with dates, also appear on Jain statuary discovered in Mathura.

References

Bibliography
 Falk, Harry (2001). "The yuga of Sphujiddhvaja and the era of the Kuṣâṇas." Silk Road Art and Archaeology VII, pp. 121–136.
Falk, Harry (2004). "The Kaniṣka era in Gupta records." Harry Falk. Silk Road Art and Archaeology X, pp. 167–176.
Sims-Williams, Nicholas (1998). "Further notes on the Bactrian inscription of Rabatak, with an Appendix on the names of Kujula Kadphises and Vima Taktu in Chinese." Proceedings of the Third European Conference of Iranian Studies Part 1: Old and Middle Iranian Studies. Edited by Nicholas Sims-Williams. Wiesbaden. Pp, 79-93.

External links
 Coins of Vasudeva
 Coins of late Kushan emperors
 Vasudeva coin
 Online catalogue of coins of Vasudeva

Kushan emperors
2nd-century births
3rd-century Indian monarchs
2nd-century Indian monarchs
3rd-century deaths